Ampelokipoi or Ampelokipi, meaning 'vineyards', is a large, central district of the city of Athens. Ampelokipoi is in the center of Athens, near Zografou, Goudi, Psychiko and Pagkrati. The area is famous for hosting Panathinaikos's home ground since it was inaugurated in 1922.

Two metro stations are located in the district: the Ambelokipi station and the Panormou station.

History

Before the Greek independence, at the beginning of the 19th century, Ampelokipoi was a village a few kilometers north-east of Athens. The village Ampelokipoi is noted in the maps of this period. In the late 19th century, the village still remained outside the boundaries of Athens agglomeration. Then some cottages of rich Athenians were built in this area. Due to its healthy climate, many hospitals were built in Ampelokipoi in the late 19th century and the beginning of the 20th. Today in this area there are the hospitals Erythros Stavros Hospital (Red Cross), Errikos Dynan Hospital, Ippokrateio Hospital, Elpis Hospital and Agios Sabbas Hospital. The population explosion in Ampelokipoi happened after the Asia Minor Disaster, in 1922, when many refugees settled in this area. For the residence of the refugees, the government had originally chosen the area of the stadium of Panathinaikos that had been built in the same period. So a conflict broke out between refugees and Panathinaikos fans and finally the government changed the place for the settling of refugees. The new district was named Kountouriotika and was located around of Panathinaikos stadium. Few years later the government built a new neighborhood for the refugees opposite of Panathinaikos stadium, known as prosfygika of Alexandras Avenue. These houses were built between 1933 and 1935 and today some of them have proclaimed monuments of historical heritage.

Sports
Ampelokipoi is where Panathinaikos' ground lies today. It as also the home to Ampelokipoi B.C., a basketball club founded in 1929.

Buildings
Important buildings located in the area:

Government buildings
 Hellenic Police Headquarters (Αστυνομικό Μέγαρο)
 Court of Cassation (Greece) (Άρειος Πάγος)
 Athens Prefecture Building (Νομαρχία Αθηνών)

Hospitals

 Erythros Stavros Hospital (Red Cross)
 Errikos Dunant Hospital (Henry Dunant)
 Hippokrateio Hospital
 Elpis Hospital
 Agios Savvas Hospital

Schools

 Formerly the Philippine School in Greece (Katipunan Philippines Cultural Academy)

Other

 Apostolos Nikolaidis Stadium – the traditional athletic center of Panathinaikos A.C.
 Athens Tower (Πύργος των Αθηνών) – the tallest building in Greece.
 Apollo Tower (Πύργος Απόλλων) – the tallest residential tower in Greece. It is 80m tall and consists of 25 floors.
 Prosfygika of Alexandras Avenue
 Petraki Monastery

Hotels
 President Hotel Athens

Cinemas
 Aavora
 Alfavil
 Astron
 Athinaion
 Danaos
 Galaxias
 Nirvana
 ODEON Zina
 Plaza

Residential streets

This is a list of residential streets in the Ampelokipoi area. Most of these are named after geographic locations:

References

Neighbourhoods in Athens